Heliophanus uvirensis is a jumping spider species in the genus Heliophanus.  It was first described by Wanda Wesołowska in 1986 and lives in Democratic Republic of the Congo.

References

Spiders described in 1986
Fauna of the Democratic Republic of the Congo
Salticidae
Spiders of Africa
Taxa named by Wanda Wesołowska
Endemic fauna of the Democratic Republic of the Congo